Sazany Ugol is a rural locality (a khutor) in Kochkovatsky Selsoviet, Kharabalinsky District, Astrakhan Oblast, Russia. The population was 13 as of 2010. There are 2 streets.

Geography 
Sazany Ugol is located 17 km west of Kharabali (the district's administrative centre) by road. Kharabali is the nearest rural locality.

References 

Rural localities in Kharabalinsky District